Ann-Cathrin Giegerich (born 4 January 1992) is a German handball player. She plays for the club Debreceni VSC, and on the German national team.

References

German female handball players
1992 births
Living people